Mary Mothersill (1923, Edmonton, Alberta, Canada - 22 January 2008, New York City) was a Canadian philosopher.

Life
Mary Mothersill gained a BA in English from the University of Toronto in 1944, a master's degree in philosophy from Radcliffe College in 1945, and in 1954 a PhD from Harvard University, for a dissertation entitled Lewis and Stevenson: A Critical Comparison of Two Theories of Value.

After teaching at Vassar College (1947–51), and at Columbia University, the University of Connecticut, the University of Michigan, the University of Chicago, and City College of New York, she joined the faculty of Columbia University's women's undergraduate college, Barnard College, teaching there and at the  Columbia Graduate School of Arts and Sciences from 1963 until her retirement in 1993.

Mothersill, early in her career, published on metaethics, moral knowledge, the nature of art and criticism, death, feminism, pornography, and other topics. Her Beauty Restored (Oxford: Clarendon Press, 1984) is widely regarded as a central text in the literature on aesthetics.

In 2003 Mary Mothersill was elected to the American Academy of Arts and Sciences. In 1986 she was a visiting fellow at Wolfson College, Oxford, and she was later Alfred North Whitehead lecturer at Harvard University.

References

External links
 http://aesthetics-online.org/?page=MaryMothersillLN (obituary by Linda Nochlin)
 http://www.humesociety.org/archive/inMemoriam.asp (Hume Society obituary)

1923 births
2008 deaths
Canadian philosophers
People from Edmonton
Radcliffe College alumni
University of Toronto alumni
20th-century Canadian philosophers